NGC 3851 is an elliptical or lenticular galaxy located about 300 million light-years away in the constellation Leo. It was discovered by astronomer John Herschel on February 24, 1827 and is a member of the Leo Cluster.

See also
 List of NGC objects (3001–4000)

References

External links
 

3851
36516
Leo (constellation)
Leo Cluster
Lenticular galaxies
Astronomical objects discovered in 1827
Elliptical galaxies